Toute l'Histoire is a French television channel based on historical documentaries.

History
La Chaîne Histoire was created in April 1996, as part of the launch of the AB Sat satellite package. It started as the French version of The History Channel from the United States which used its logo.

After the creation of the channel Histoire by France Télévision and La Sept-ARTE in 1997, AB Groupe renamed the channel Toute l'Histoire in 2000 to avoid confusion with these channels, and also breaking the similarity with the American version.

After rumours of the sale of the channel by AB Groupe at the beginning of 2006, it eventually became part of the group of channels exclusively shown on satellite via CanalSat.

In 2020, StarTimes ceased to offer the AB channels.

Its main rival is Histoire, owned by TF1 Group.

The channel will become Le Monde Histoire following an agreement with Le Monde.

Budget
Toute l'Histoire is 100% owned by AB Sat SA and has a budget of €24million, provided for television by AB Groupe.

Programmes
The channel specialises in the history of France and the world, its programmes consisting primarily of historical documentaries, but also films and stories to explore all aspects of history. *L'histoire à la une : series of unedited interviews led by Michèle Cotta which aim to examine the news from a historical angle. In each episode, Michèle Cotta meets a person who he speaks to about a topical theme.

Broadcast
Toute l'Histoire was originally only broadcast on AB Sat, but is now available on a contract as part of French, Monacan, Belgian and Swiss cable, on the Nouveau Canalsat satellite package, and, only on AB Groupe as part of the main ADSL package.

See also

 AB Groupe

External links
  Official website
  Programmes on Toute l'Histoire

Mediawan Thematics
Television channels and stations established in 1996
1996 establishments in France
French-language television stations
Television stations in France